Nuovo Canzoniere Italiano was an Italian language music magazine published in Milan, Italy.

History and profile
Nuovo Canzoniere Italiano was created in 1964 in Milan by the historian Gianni Bosio and the ethnomusicologist Roberto Leydi. They belonged to a group of musicians linked to the left ideological political-cultural movement of the late sixties. They tried to create a new musical movement for the renaissance of the Italian popular music.

Collaborators

 Nuccio Ambrosino
 Fausto Amodei
 Stefano Arrighetti
 Rudi Assuntino
 Dante Bellamio
 Cesare Bermani
 Gianni Bosio
 Caterina Bueno
 Paolo Ciarchi
 Franco Coggiola
 Giovanna Daffini
 Alberto D'Amico
 Ivan Della Mea
 Roberto Leydi
 Sergio Liberovici
 Giovanna Marini
 Giuseppe Morandi
 Piero Nissim
 Alessandro Portelli
 Riccardo Schwamenthal
 Michele Straniero

See also
 List of magazines in Italy

References

1964 establishments in Italy
Magazines established in 1964
Italian-language magazines
Music magazines published in Italy
Magazines published in Milan